Alco is an unincorporated community in Stone County, Arkansas, United States. The Alco School, which is listed on the National Register of Historic Places, is located in Alco.

References

Unincorporated communities in Stone County, Arkansas
Unincorporated communities in Arkansas